Tsolov's mouse-like hamster or Syrian calomyscus (Calomyscus tsolovi) is a species of rodent in the family Calomyscidae.
It is endemic to Syria.

References

Mouse-like hamsters
Mouse-like Hamster, Tsolov's
Mouse-like Hamster, Tsolov's
Endemic fauna of Syria
Mammals described in 1991
Taxonomy articles created by Polbot